Gopal Italia  (born 21 July 1989) is an Indian politician and a social activist. He was ex-police official and a leader of the Patidar reservation agitation. From December 2020 to January 2023, he was the Convener (State president) of Aam Aadmi Party in Gujarat.

Italia became known in January 2017, when serving as a government employee, he called up Deputy Chief Minister Nitin Patel and complained to him about the open violation of the alcohol prohibition policy in Gujarat and alleged collusion of public servants. The video of the conversation became viral on social media. In March 2017, Italia was in the news for hurling a shoe at Minister of State for Home Pradeepsinh Jadeja and shouting 'down with corruption'. 

Between 2018 and 2020 Italia was associated with the social organization Patidar Anamat Andolan Samiti (PAAS). In 2018, he organized public meetings named Kayda Katha to raise awareness about Constitution law. In June 2020, Italia joined AAP as the State Vice President of Aam Aadmi Party, Gujarat. He was appointed the State President of the party on 12 December 2020. In November 2018, in a live video on Facebook, Italia fired shots into the air demonstrating a plastic gun for use by farmers to scare away animals who damage crops. The video of the incident became viral.

88,000 aspirants had appeared in the written examination, for recruitment of 186 head clerks, held on 12 December 2021. After paper leak the exam was cancelled. Italia along with 500 AAP members protested outside the BJP office for removal of Bharatiya Janata Party (BJP) leader Asit Vora from the post of chairman of Gujarat Subordinate Service Selection Board (GSSSB) that conducted the examination. Italia and others spent 10 days in prison before getting bail in the case filed by BJP leader for the protest. 

Under Italia's tenure as president, AAP Gujarat debuted in the February 2021 Gujarat local body elections. AAP won 27 seats in the Surat Municipal Corporation and one in the Gandhinagar Municipal Corporation. In 2022 he was re-appointed as the president of AAP Gujarat, to prepare the  party for the 2022 Gujarat Legislative Assembly election. In this election party grabbed 12.92% vote with 5 seat.

Early life 
Gopal was born on 21 July 1989 in Botad in Gujarat, India. He completed his primary studies at Timbi village in Umrala Taluka of Bhavnagar district and his secondary studies at Dhola village. He graduated from Gujarat University, Ahmedabad with a degree in Political Science.

Career
From January 2013, Italia worked as a constable in Madhupura Police Station in Ahmedabad Police, then in 2014 as a Revenue Clerk  posted at the office of Dhandhuka taluka Sub-Divisional Magistrate under Ahmedabad Collectorate. He campaigns for the rights of unemployed youth as well as the rights of citizens.

Social activism 
Italia was a social activist and took part in the Patidar reservation agitation as member of the Botad Patidar Anamat Andolan Samiti and organization of the village of Lathidad in his early days. He credits these organizations for grooming him to be a consistent leader. Later he was associated with Gujarat and District Patidar Andolan Samiti. He was close to Hardik Patel during the Patidar reservation agitation 2015. He visited many villages to solve the legal problems of the citizens and made them aware of the Indian constitution and the law.

He phoned Deputy Chief Minister Nitin Patel over the enforcement of the laws banning on alcohol, an audio clip of which went viral on social media. The one minute long clip caused a massive embarrassment in the state government, because he claimed to be a constable and alleged that senior officers were preventing lower cadre officers from enforcing prohibition laws. He was charged under Section 120 of the Indian Penal Code in the incident.

In 2017, he threw a shoe at State Home Minister Pradipsinh Jadeja and shouted 'down with corruption', in the midst of a difficult time in government duty and an outcry against government policies. He was suspended from his government job after the incident for violating the service rules. In 2017, he resigned from his government job.

Italia became publicly active after the incident. He became a vocal critic of the ruling BJP. Between 2018 and 2020 Italia was associated with the social organization Patidar Anamat Andolan Samiti (PAAS). In 2018, he organized public meetings named Kayda Katha to raise awareness about Constitution law. Speeches of experts on subjects like Indian Constitution, police, court, education, law related to election, Motor Vehicle Act, agriculture, land etc were part of the meeting.

In November 2018, in a live video on Facebook, Italia fired shots into the air with a plastic gun to demonstrate the new contraption made by farmers. The gun was for use by farmers as there was court ban on bursting of firecrackers, often used by farmers in field. Italia said in the video, "This is for the explosion as it doesn’t come under the guidelines of the Supreme Court or any other laws". Indian Express reported that it was likely a reference to Supreme Court ban on bursting of firecrackers. The video of the incident became viral. Later Italia said, "Some farmers have invented this (‘PVC pistol’) for scaring away animals which destroy their crops. Apart from attacking the BJP I also used the video to send out a message to protect our environment. I believe that it is not as dangerous as other firecrackers. We all should protect our environment." In January 2019, Gopal was arrested under the Arms Act for shooting a plastic gun.

Aam Aadmi Party 
In June 2020, Italia joined Gujarat state unit of Aam Aadmi Party (AAP) as the State Vice President. He was appointed the State President on 12 December 2020. 

In June 2021, AAP Gujarat planned an outreach programme of a statewide tour to connect with families of the victims of the COVID-19 pandemic. The outreach was started with a visit to the Somnath temple. Italia stated that AAP had shared with the local police, information about a plan by the Bharatiya Janata Party (BJP) to disrupt the AAP programme by attacking the participants and creating ruckus outside the temple. When Italia and his party workers were exiting the temple, they were surrounded by some people who made allegations on Italia about a five year old video. Italia said that the AAP members were mobbed and attacked, later their car was chased. AAP Gujarat said that the incident was orchestrated by BJP. Italia reached Prabhas Patan police station in Gir Somnath to lodge a formal complaint. Italia said that the police threatened him with filing a police case against him. Italia said about the video, "BJP in the past have been making attacks against Arvind Kejriwal, Gopal Italia, Isudan Gadhvi through morphed or edited videos. If there has been such a video in the past then why no questions were raised back then? This is a conspiracy by the BJP to instigate the people against us. If someone’s religious feeling has been hurt due to my comments in the past, then I apologise to them."

In July 2021, Italia's family was threatened by four men.

In August 2021, Italia visited a temple in Unjha taluka as part of the AAP's outreach programme. He was arrested by the Mehsana police in a case filed in December 2020 against him for holding a public meeting and demonstration in Mehsana without prior police permission. AAP members staged a protest outside the police station and alleged the arrest was due to political vendetta by the BJP state government. In the evening, Italia was released on bail.

2021 Gujarat Municipal corporation elections
AAP made its debut in the February 2021 Gujarat local body elections, it contested elections to six municipal corporations, namely Ahmedabad, Surat, Vadodara, Rajkot, Bhavnagar and Jamnagar. It found major success in Surat and Rajkot. The overall vote share across the six municipal corporations was 13.28%.  Italia credited the success in the election to party's positive and honest campaigning.

In October 2021, AAP contested the Gandhinagar municipal elections. It received 21.77% of the votes and won one seat.

The Aam Aadmi Party gained a strong 79% majority in the sixteenth Punjab Legislative Assembly by winning 92 out of 117 seats in the 2022 Punjab Legislative Assembly election. MP Bhagwant Mann was sworn in as Chief Minister on 16 March 2022. Italia hailed the victory as "dream of clean politics coming true".

Protests against recruitment exam paper leak 
The written examination for recruitment of head clerks was held on 12 December 2021 in which with 88,000 aspirants had appeared for 186 vacancies. The exam was conducted by Gujarat Subordinate Service Selection Board (GSSSB). Asit Vora, a Bharatiya Janata Party (BJP) leader served as the chairman of GSSSB. AAP had alleged that before the examination, the question paper was leaked and sold at cost of Rs 8-12 lakh. Later on Gujarat government annulled the exam and announced re-examination scheduled for March 2022. Gujarat police made 18 arrests in the racket.

500 supporters of AAP staged a protest outside the Shree Kamalam office of the BJP located in Gandhinagar demanding the removal of BJP leader Asit Vora from the post of chairman of the Gujarat Subordinate Service Selection Board. BJP workers clashed with AAP protestors and the police resorted to lathicharge. Ninety-three AAP members were arrested including 28 women. AAP president Italia, AAP women's wing and youth wing presidents were among those arrested. Italia and others spent 10 days in prison before getting bail in the case filed by BJP leader for the protest.

2022 Gujarat Legislative Assembly election
In June 2022, in preparation for the upcoming 2022 Gujarat Legislative Assembly election, the organization structure of AAP Gujarat was reshuffled and fresh appointments were announced. Gopal Italia was retained as the state president of AAP Gujarat. Italia launched an Electricity Movement in Gujarat in the same month.

In the 2022 Gujarat toxic liquor deaths 50 people died after consuming illicitly produced liquor. After the incident, alcohol and drug consumption became a major issue for the election. Italia said that the prohibition on the sale of alcohol is not enforced strictly and bootlegging of liquor is rampant across the state, due to the nexus between the bootleggers and the local police under the patronage of the ruling Bharatiya Janata Party in the state. Italia demanded an investigation by Central Bureau of Investigation (CBI) in the incident.

In the first half of October, a video of  Italia went viral in which he called Prime Minister Narendra Modi, 'neech' (a lowly person). The National Commission for Women has issued a notice to Gopal Italia and summoned him to appear before commission on October 13 in Delhi.  On 13 October, the Delhi Police detained Italia from the office of the National Commission for Women, and taken to the police station where he was questioned for 2.5 hours.

References

Living people
Aam Aadmi Party politicians
1989 births
Indian social workers
People from Botad
Gujarat University alumni